Geoffrey sometimes known as Geoffrey Kirtling or Kytlynge, was a Priest in the Roman Catholic Church.

Career
He was appointed Dean of Lincoln between 1181 and 1182. In 1169, although according to some sources, this may be 1176 he was a Prebendary of Aylesbury.

Not to be confused with Geoffrey who was Bishop of Lincoln and Archdeacon of Lincoln. As Geoffrey Kirtling is supposed to have died in 1182 or 1183 as in December 1183 Salomon of Paris writes to Richard de Malebis and presents him with "four pounds due to his lord Aaron, paid on Monday after Martinmas following the death of Geoffrey [Kirtling], High-Dean of Lincoln, in part payment of 'the great debt which he owes to my Lord Aaron, whereof I have appointed him a day for settlement'."

References
 
 

Deans of Lincoln
12th-century English Roman Catholic priests